Josh Wallwork (born c. 1975) is a former American football player.  He attended Tracy High School in Tracy, California, and played college football for Gavilan College in Gilroy, California, before transferring to the University of Wyoming in 1995. He played for Joe Tiller's Wyoming Cowboys football team in 1995 and 1996.  As a senior in 1996, he led all NCAA major college players in several statistical categories, including total offense yards (4,209), total offense per game (350.8), passing yards (4,090), and pass completions (286).

See also
 List of NCAA major college football yearly passing leaders
 List of NCAA major college football yearly total offense leaders

References

Living people
American football quarterbacks
Gavilan Rams football players
Wyoming Cowboys football players
Players of American football from California
People from Tracy, California
Year of birth missing (living people)